Myat Noe Khin (born 24 July 2003) is a Burmese footballer who plays as a forward for the Myanmar women's national team.

International goals

References

2003 births
Living people
Women's association football forwards
Burmese women's footballers
Sportspeople from Yangon
Myanmar women's international footballers